Niki Erlenmeyer-Kimling (April 18, 1932 – February 16, 2021) was a professor of clinical psychiatry at Columbia University and chief of the Division of Genetics at New York State Psychiatric Institute.

Research
Her research interests included genetic aspects of mental disorders (mainly schizophrenia) and human behavior genetics generally. She conducted a longitudinal, prospective study of early indicators of later schizophrenia and a genetic-linkage, gene search study of schizophrenia in Croatia.

Honors
Her honors included Phi Beta Kappa, Sigma Xi, the Dobzhansky Award, a National Institute of Mental Health Merit Award, the Warren Schizophrenia Research Award, an honorary doctorate of the State University of New York, a Lifetime Achievement Award from the International Society of Psychiatric Genetics, and a NARSAD  Distinguished Investigator Award.

References

External links

1932 births
2021 deaths
American women psychiatrists
American psychiatrists
Columbia University faculty
Psychiatric geneticists
American geneticists
American women geneticists
Schizophrenia researchers
American women academics
21st-century American women